The L postcode area, also known as the Liverpool postcode area, is a group of postcode districts in north-west England, which are subdivisions of four post towns. These cover most of Merseyside (including Liverpool, Bootle and Prescot), part of west Lancashire (including Ormskirk) and a small part of north-west Cheshire.

In 1999, postcodes for the Wirral Peninsula (L41-49, 60-66) were transferred to the CH postcode area.



Coverage
The approximate coverage of the postcode districts:

|-
! L1
| LIVERPOOL
| City centre
| Liverpool
|-
! L2
| LIVERPOOL
| City centre
| Liverpool
|-
! L3
| LIVERPOOL
| City centre, Everton, Vauxhall
| Liverpool
|-
! L4
| LIVERPOOL
| Anfield, Kirkdale, Walton
| Liverpool
|-
! L5
| LIVERPOOL
| Anfield, Everton, Kirkdale, Vauxhall
| Liverpool
|-
! L6
| LIVERPOOL
| Anfield, city centre, Everton, Fairfield, Kensington, Tuebrook
| Liverpool
|-
! L7
| LIVERPOOL
| City centre, Edge Hill, Fairfield, Kensington
| Liverpool
|-
! L8
| LIVERPOOL

| City centre, Dingle, Toxteth
| Liverpool
|-
! L9
| LIVERPOOL
| Aintree, Fazakerley, Orrell Park, Walton
| Liverpool, Sefton
|-
! L10
| LIVERPOOL
| Aintree, Fazakerley, Kirkby
| Sefton, Liverpool, Knowsley
|-
! L11
| LIVERPOOL
| Clubmoor, Croxteth, Gillmoss, Norris Green
| Liverpool
|-
! L12
| LIVERPOOL
| Croxteth, West Derby
| Liverpool
|-
! L13
| LIVERPOOL
| Clubmoor, Old Swan, Stoneycroft, Tuebrook
| Liverpool
|-
! L14
| LIVERPOOL
| Broadgreen, Dovecot, Knotty Ash, Page Moss
| Liverpool, Knowsley
|-
! L15
| LIVERPOOL
| Wavertree
| Liverpool
|-
! L16
| LIVERPOOL
| Broadgreen, Bowring Park, Childwall
| Liverpool, Knowsley
|-
! L17
| LIVERPOOL
| Aigburth, St Michael's Hamlet, Sefton Park
| Liverpool
|-
! L18
| LIVERPOOL
| Allerton, Mossley Hill
| Liverpool
|-
! L19
| LIVERPOOL
| Aigburth, Garston, Grassendale
| Liverpool
|-
! rowspan="2"|L20
| BOOTLE
| Bootle, Orrell
| Sefton
|-
| LIVERPOOL
| Kirkdale
| Liverpool
|-
! L21
| LIVERPOOL
| Ford, Litherland, Seaforth
| Sefton
|-
! L22
| LIVERPOOL
| Waterloo
| Sefton
|-
! L23
| LIVERPOOL
| Blundellsands, Brighton-le-Sands, Crosby, Little Crosby, Thornton
| Sefton
|-
! L24
| LIVERPOOL
| Hale, Speke
| Halton, Liverpool
|-
! L25
| LIVERPOOL
| Belle Vale, Gateacre, Halewood, Hunts Cross, Woolton
| Liverpool, Knowsley
|-
! L26
| LIVERPOOL
| Halewood
| Liverpool, Knowsley
|-
! L27
| LIVERPOOL
| Netherley
| Liverpool
|-
! L28
| LIVERPOOL
| Stockbridge Village
| Liverpool, Knowsley
|-
! L29
| LIVERPOOL
| Lunt, Sefton
| Sefton
|-
! L30
| BOOTLE
| Bootle, Netherton
| Sefton
|-
! L31
| LIVERPOOL
| Lydiate, Maghull, Melling, Waddicar
| Sefton
|-
! L32
| LIVERPOOL
| Kirkby
| Knowsley
|-
! L33
| LIVERPOOL
| Kirkby
| Knowsley
|-
! L34
| PRESCOT
| Knowsley, Prescot
| Knowsley
|-
! L35
| PRESCOT
| Prescot, Rainhill, Whiston
| Knowsley, St Helens
|-
! L36
| LIVERPOOL
| Huyton, Roby, Tarbock
| Knowsley
|-
! L37
| LIVERPOOL
| Formby, Great Altcar, Little Altcar
| Sefton, West Lancashire
|-
! L38
| LIVERPOOL
| Hightown, Ince Blundell
| Sefton, West Lancashire
|-
! L39
| ORMSKIRK
| Aughton, Ormskirk
| West Lancashire
|-
! L40
| ORMSKIRK
| Burscough, Holmeswood, Mawdesley, Scarisbrick, Rufford
| West Lancashire, Chorley
|-
! style="background:#FFFFFF;"|L67
| style="background:#FFFFFF;"|LIVERPOOL
| style="background:#FFFFFF;"|Littlewoods Pools
| style="background:#FFFFFF;"|non-geographic
|-
! style="background:#FFFFFF;"|L68
| style="background:#FFFFFF;"|LIVERPOOL
| style="background:#FFFFFF;"|Vernons Pools
| style="background:#FFFFFF;"|non-geographic
|-
! style="background:#FFFFFF;"|L69
| style="background:#FFFFFF;"|LIVERPOOL
| style="background:#FFFFFF;"|PO boxes in central Liverpool, government departments in Liverpool and Bootle, the University of Liverpool
| style="background:#FFFFFF;"|non-geographic
|-
! style="background:#FFFFFF;"|L70
| style="background:#FFFFFF;"|LIVERPOOL
| style="background:#FFFFFF;"|Seasonal response mail
| style="background:#FFFFFF;"|non-geographic
|-
! style="background:#FFFFFF;"|L71
| style="background:#FFFFFF;"|LIVERPOOL
| style="background:#FFFFFF;"|American Express
| style="background:#FFFFFF;"|non-geographic
|-
! style="background:#FFFFFF;"|L72
| style="background:#FFFFFF;"|LIVERPOOL
| style="background:#FFFFFF;"|Shop Direct
| style="background:#FFFFFF;"|non-geographic
|-
! style="background:#FFFFFF;"|L73
| style="background:#FFFFFF;"|LIVERPOOL
| style="background:#FFFFFF;"|BT Group, large Selectapost users
| style="background:#FFFFFF;"|non-geographic
|-
! style="background:#FFFFFF;"|L74
| style="background:#FFFFFF;"|LIVERPOOL
| style="background:#FFFFFF;"|HM Revenue and Customs (Customs and Excise)
| style="background:#FFFFFF;"|non-geographic
|-
! style="background:#FFFFFF;"|L75
| style="background:#FFFFFF;"|LIVERPOOL
| style="background:#FFFFFF;"|HM Revenue and Customs (Inland Revenue)
| style="background:#FFFFFF;"|non-geographic
|-
! style="background:#FFFFFF;"|L80
| style="background:#FFFFFF;"|BOOTLE
| style="background:#FFFFFF;"|
| style="background:#FFFFFF;"|non-geographic
|}

Map

See also
Postcode Address File
List of postcode areas in the United Kingdom

References

External links
Royal Mail's Postcode Address File
A quick introduction to Royal Mail's Postcode Address File (PAF)
Photographing Every Street in the Liverpool Postal Area

Liverpool
Liverpool Urban Area
Postcode areas covering North West England
Borough of West Lancashire